Myrtle is a ghost town in Walnut Township, Phillips County, Kansas, United States.

History
Myrtle was issued a post office in 1878. The post office was discontinued in 1904.

References

Former populated places in Phillips County, Kansas
Former populated places in Kansas